Barantsevo is a rural locality (a village) in Kaltymanovsky Selsoviet, Iglinsky District, Bashkortostan, Russia. The population was 85 as of 2010. There are 3 streets.

Geography 
Barantsevo is located 21 km south of Iglino (the district's administrative centre) by road. Bibakhtino is the nearest rural locality.

See also 
Barantsev

References 

Rural localities in Iglinsky District